

Events 
Johann Friedrich Agricola succeeds Carl Heinrich Graun as director of Frederick the Great's royal opera.
Castrato Gaspare Pacchierotti makes his debut at the Perugia carnival, in a female role.
Tommaso Traetta becomes court composer at Parma.

Popular music 
 None listed

Opera 
Johann Ernst Eberlin – Demofoonte (lost)
Baldassare Galuppi – La clemenza di Tito
Florian Leopold Gassmann – Gli uccellatori
Christoph Willibald Gluck – L'Arbre enchantée; Cythère Assiégée
François Danican Philidor – Blaise le savetier
Tommaso Traetta – Ippolito ed Aricia

Classical music 
Carl Friedrich Abel – 6 Symphonies, Op. 1
Carl Philipp Emanuel Bach – Viola da Gamba Sonata in G minor, H.510
Wilhelm Friedemann Bach – Pieces for Musical Clock
Claude-Bénigne Balbastre – Pièces de clavecin
William Boyce – "Heart of Oak"
François Joseph Gossec – Sei sinfonie a più stromenti, op.4
Joseph Haydn 
Divertimento in G major, Hob.II:G1
Symphony no 1 in D Major Hob.I:1
Leopold Mozart 
Der Morgen und der Abend (pieces for keyboard)
Nannerl's Music Book
Johan Helmich Roman – Concerto Grosso, BeRI 45
Georg Philipp Telemann – Der Messias, TWV 6:4

Methods and music theory 

 Pietro Gianotti – Le guide du compositeur
 Cornforth Gilson – Lessons on the Practice of Singing
 Antoine Mahaut – Nouvelle Méthode pour jouer la Flûte Traversière
 Friedrich Wilhelm Marpurg – Kritische Einleitung in die Geschichte und Lehrsätze der alten und neuen Musik
 Robert Smith – Harmonics, or The Philosophy of Musical Sounds

Births 
January 19 – Karl Alexander Herklots, librettist and author (died 1830)
January 24 – Francesco Saverio Salfi, librettist and writer (died 1832)
January 25 – Robert Burns, Scottish poet and lyricist (died 1796)
January 31 – François Devienne, composer (died 1803)
February 1 – Karl Friedrich Hensler, librettist and author (died 1825)
February 11 – Ernst von Gemmingen, composer and diplomat (died 1813)
February 27 – Johann Carl Friedrich Rellstab, music editor and composer (died 1813)
April 18 – Jacques Widerkehr,  Alsatian composer and cellist (died 1823)
15 May – Maria Theresia von Paradis, musician and composer (died 1824)
May 22 – Gervais-François Couperin, French composer (died 1826)
June 19 – Helen Maria Williams, librettist and writer (died 1827)
19 July – Marianna Auenbrugger, composer (died 1782)
July 29 – Antonio Simone Sografi, librettist and playwright (died 1818)
November 10 – Friedrich Schiller, librettist and poet (died 1805)
November 27 – Franz Krommer, composer (died 1831)
December 25 – John Beckwith, composer and musician (died 1809) 
unknown date 
Franz Gleissner, German composer (died 1818)  
William Matthews of Nottingham, composer

Deaths 
March 19 – Sebastian Bodinus, German composer (born c. 1700)
April 14 – George Frideric Handel, composer (born 1685)
June 12 – William Collins, librettist and poet (born 1721)
June 22 – Louis de Cahusac, librettist (born 1706)
July 25 – Johann Christoph Altnickol, organist, singer and composer (born 1719)
August 8 – Carl Heinrich Graun, composer (born 1704)
August 24 – Ewald Christian von Kleist, librettist and poet (born 1715)
September 4 – Girolamo Chiti, composer 
October 18 – Louis de Caix d'Hervelois, French composer (born c. 1680) 
date unknown – Gustavus Waltz, singer 

 
18th century in music
Music by year